PEPO Lappeenranta (abbreviated PEPO) is a football club from Lappeenranta in Finland.  The club was formed in 1958 and their home ground is at the Kimpinen Sports Centre. The men's first team currently plays in the Ykkönen (Second Division).  The chairman of PEPO is Kari Suninen and the men's first team is managed by Janne Muhli.

History

PEPO's inaugural meeting was held at the Lavola School in Lappee municipality on 12 November 1958. The name of the club was chosen as Uus-Lavolan Peli-Pojat at the first annual general meeting of the club held on 30 November 1958. The first official match played by the club was at the Vanha kenttä against Lauritsalan Pallokerho on 10 May 1959.

During the 1970s and 1980s PEPO played in the lower divisions of the Finnish football system in the Nelonen (Fourth Division) and Vitonen (Fifth Division). Between 1973 and 1975 the club also ran a women's team. In 1987 the men's team were promoted to the Kolmonen (Third Division) but their visit lasted only one year. In the mid-1990s PEPO changed league several times playing in the Nelonen in 1994, Kolmonen in 1995, Kakkonen (Second Division) in 1996 before returning to the Kolmonen again in 1997.

The 1996 season proved a big disappointment in the Kakkonen when despite a good start with three wins and a draw there followed a downturn, which not even the former national team coach Jukka Vakkila, who came to coach Markku Timonen's aid, could stop.

PEPO played their second season in the Kakkonen in 2001 in the Eastern Group and finished in the tenth position which was the final relegation position. In 2002 the club reached the sixth round of the Finnish Cup which was the highest attained by a club playing in Kolmonen or below. PEPO lost 5–0 at home to Premier Division side Haka but the reward for their achievement was to be Finland's representative in the UEFA Regions' Cup, an amateur tournament, in which they faced the teams from Belgium (the host country), Andorra and Spain. PEPO lost their three tournament games with a goal difference of 3–12.

In January 2009 PEPO merged with the Rakuunat youth organisation Rakuunat Juniorit. As a result of the merger also the Rakuunat Juniorit women's team playing in the Kakkonen (Second Division) moved under the auspices of PEPO. In 2009 the men's team again tasted success by winning their Kolmonen group and gaining promotion back to the Kakkonen.

Season to season

Other sports

PEPO selected football as the main sporting activity soon after the establishment of the club. However, the club played ice hockey for 39 years until 1999 when the ice hockey section was relocated to PEPO Hockey.

Facilities

The club's training centre is located in Sammonlahti, a western district of Lappeenranta. The training centre provides grass and artificial turf pitches. Since 2009 the men's team has played their home games at the Kimpinen Sports Centre in the Kimpinen district. A heated artificial turf pitch next to the South Karelia Vocational School in the Lepola district and the Sammonlahti Sports Hall are used during winter.

Until the 2000s PEPO's home ground was in Tapavainola.

Youth activities

PEPO has a strong youth section. This position was further strengthened by the merger with Rakuunat Juniorit at the beginning of 2009, which has created one of the biggest soccer teams in the area administered by the South-East regional office of the Football Association of Finland. In addition to the men's and women's teams PEPO currently has 8 boys' teams and 3 girls' teams. Another important constituent is the close association with Lappee JK, a sister club that fields PEPO's reserve team in the Nelonen (Fourth Division) and an under-17 team.

PEPO has received numerous recognitions including the Seal of the Young Finland Association for the quality of their youth work.  The club has employed a full-time youth head coach since 2002 and a youth director since 2009.

The club has extended its international links with cooperation ties with FC Utrecht, Fortuna Sittard and SO Soest.

Competition 

PEPO's men's team are competing in Group C of the Kakkonen (Third Division) administered by the Football Association of Finland. This is the third highest tier in the Finnish football league system. In 2009 PEPO finished in first position in the South-East group of the Kolmonen (Fourth Division).

PEPO's women's team are competing in Group A of the Kakkonen (Second Division) administered by the Football Association of Finland.

Current squad

References and sources
Official Website
Suomen Cup

Footnotes

Football clubs in Finland
Lappeenranta
1958 establishments in Finland